The  was a rich source of copper in Niihama, Ehime Prefecture, Japan. The deposits were discovered in 1690, and copper mining began in the following year. From then until the closing of the mine in 1973, Besshi produced about 700,000 tons of copper, and contributed to Japan's trade and modernization. The Sumitomo family managed the mine, which helped build the Sumitomo zaibatsu. The Dōzan River was named after the copper mine.

The Minetopia Besshi theme park uses some of the mine's facilities.

External links
Besshi Dōzan (Niihama official web site)
ehime maintopiabesshi (Ministry of Land, Infrastructure and Transport)

Copper mines in Japan
Buildings and structures in Ehime Prefecture
Sumitomo Heavy Industries
Niihama, Ehime
Former mines in Japan
1973 disestablishments in Japan